Pro-Composites, Inc is an American aircraft manufacturer based in Buffalo Grove, Illinois. The company is owned by Scott VanderVeen and specializes in the design and manufacture of aircraft design plans, parts and kits for amateur construction.

The company was originally formed at and had its flight testing and manufacturing operations in Daytona Beach, Florida, circa 2008. By 2010 operations had been moved to Waukegan Regional Airport, near Chicago, with its business address at Buffalo Grove, Illinois.

The company's designs are all based on the design work of Steve Rahn and his use of pre-formed flat fiberglass and foam composite panels which are then radius bent to shape, a method they refer to as "Fold-a-Plane". The company is currently developing the four seat Pro-Composites Freedom.

Aircraft

References

External links

Aircraft manufacturers of the United States